Schizothecium tetrasporum is a species of coprophilous fungus in the family Lasiosphaeriaceae. It is known to grow in the dung of goats and rabbits.

References

External links

Fungi described in 1972
Fungi of Greece
Fungi of Iceland
Sordariales